Christian Schilling (born 6 January 1992) is an Austrian footballer who plays for FC Zirl.

External links
 

Austrian footballers
Austrian Football Bundesliga players
2. Liga (Austria) players
1992 births
Living people
Grazer AK players
FC Wacker Innsbruck (2002) players
SC Rheindorf Altach players
SV Ried players
SC Austria Lustenau players
Austria youth international footballers
Austria under-21 international footballers
Association football fullbacks
Footballers from Graz